Pseudocochlespira is a genus of extinct sea snails, marine gastropod mollusks in the family Cochlespiridae. They were small to medium-sized, pagodiform in shape having a conical protoconch with 3.5 to 4.75 whorls.

The genus is only known from the Paleogene of the North Sea Basin.

Species
Species within the genus Pseudocochlespira include:
 † Pseudocochlespira boeggildi (Ravn, 1939)
 † Pseudocochlespira gramensis (Schnetler & Grant, 2014)
 † Pseudocochlespira koeneni (Roissy, 1805)
 † Pseudocochlespira rosenkrantzi (Schnetler, 2001)
 † Pseudocochlespira schwarzhansi (Schnetler & Palm, 2008)
 † Pseudocochlespira volgeri (Philippi, 1847)

References

Cochlespiridae
Prehistoric gastropod genera